The Pulvermaar is a water-filled maar that lies southeast of Daun in the German state of Rhineland-Palatinate. Together with the Holzmaar it is one of the Gillenfeld maars.

Description 
A tuff site in the bog formations of the neighbouring Strohner Maar is ascribed to the Pulvermaar and is therefore older than the Pulvermaar. Early pollen analyses of the bogs gave an age for the tuff site – and thus the Pulvermaar – of about 10,050 years. More recent studies show, however, underwater terraces at greater depth as well as ice wedges inside the tephra deposits, both of which suggest that the maar was formed during the last ice age, 20,000 to 30,000 years ago. Vulcanologists from the Smithsonian Institution estimate the last eruption of the Strohner Maar and Pulvermaar in 8,300 BC.

The almost circular maar has steep funnel-shaped sides.

After Lake Constance and the lakes of the Pre-Alps (the Königssee, Walchensee, Lake Starnberg, Ammersee, Chiemsee, Tegernsee) the Pulvermaar is the deepest natural lake in Germany. It is likely that the Pulvermaar was originally even deeper, perhaps as deep as 200 metres. Its rim would have had a height of 50 metres.

The maar is surrounded by woods on the rim of the crater, through which a footpath runs around the lake. There is a bathing place on the eastern shore.

See also 
 List of lakes of Germany

References

Literature 
 Werner D´hein: Natur- und Kulturführer Vulkanlandeifel. Mit 26 Stationen der „Deutschen Vulkanstraße“. Gaasterland-Verlag, Düsseldorf, 2006,

External links 

 Information about the Pulvermaar
 Geology of the Pulvermaar

Maars of the Eifel
Nature reserves in Rhineland-Palatinate
Vulkaneifel
Lakes of Rhineland-Palatinate